The Phoenix Force is a fictional entity appearing in American comic books published by Marvel Comics. Created by Chris Claremont and Dave Cockrum, the Phoenix Force is famous for its central role in The Dark Phoenix Saga storyline, and is frequently linked to Jean Grey.

Publication history

The Phoenix first appeared in The Uncanny X-Men #101 (October 1976) in the guise of Jean Grey, and was created by Chris Claremont and Dave Cockrum.

Fictional character biography
The Phoenix Force is an immortal and immutable manifestation of the universal force of life and passion. The Phoenix Force is a creation of the universe that was born of the void between states of being. It is the nexus of all psionic energy of the past, present, and future in all realities of the multiverse, the Guardian of Creation and of the dangerously powerful M'Kraan Crystal.

The Phoenix Force is among the most feared beings in all of existence—it can cut, re-grow, or destroy any part of the universe. It has been described as being "the embodiment of the very passion of Creation—the spark that gave life to the Universe, the flame that will ultimately consume it."

During its time as a sentient and formless mass of energy, it traveled the cosmos and was worshiped by several alien races, including the Shi'ar, who named the entity Phal'kon, the "sister" of their other gods K'ythri and Sharra.

According to the alien peace-keeping robot Unit, a billion years ago the alien Demon Lords of Stasis cast a spell on their planet to stop the Evolution. However, five powerful beings led by a female with pyrokinetic powers wage a rebellion against the Lords of Stasis. The rebellion drew the Phoenix to the planet. Although the Demon Lords fight to prevent it, the Phoenix communes with the female and with the loyalty of her disciples that helps her to control the infinite power of the Phoenix, she breaks the spell and the Demons are swept away.

The Phoenix is later drawn to Earth when Firehair, a young primitive female red-haired mutant overwhelmed with despair by her friends' deaths, contemplates turning her psychic abilities on herself to commit suicide at the "Burnt Place". Attracted to Firehair's untapped raw psychic power, the Phoenix prevents the suicide, bonds with her, and seeks to use her to fulfill its intended purpose of razing planets to ashes. Consumed by vengeful rage, Firehair nearly gives in to the firebird's bloodlust to become a Dark Phoenix, but is pacified by her wolf guardian and decides to use her powers to protect those weaker than herself. Using the alias Lady Phoenix, she joins that time period's incarnation of the Avengers. Her only known fight is with an out-of-control Celestial called the Fallen. During this time she and Odin share a romantic relationship that Odin considers the one time in his life when he truly felt alive. It was later claimed that from their love, Thor was born, but in truth, Phoenix left Odin due to his callousness, until millennia later, she arranged for Odin and Gaea to conceived a child. When Thor was born, his birth was felt by King Laufey who immediately killed him. The Phoenix resurrected him, leaving him permanently imbued with some of her power.

The Rise of Dark Phoenix
At some point, the entity ends up in Shi'ar space, where it bonds with a citizen of the Empire named Rook'shir, who controls the power of the Phoenix Force in conjunction with his blade. He is ultimately overwhelmed by the Phoenix's power and becomes the first known host to succumb to the Phoenix Force's destructive impulses, going insane from the power it embodied and becoming the Dark Phoenix. Rook'shir goes on a destructive rampage through the Empire and destroys many planets in the process. He is killed by the Imperial Guard, which later becomes the first line of defense of the Shi'ar Empire. The Phoenix flees, leaving a small remnant of itself in the blade, which can only be lifted by Rook'shir's descendants. Fearing the power of the Phoenix, the Shi'ar demonizes the entity and orders the deaths or sterilizations of Rook'shir's descendants.

As time passes, the entity is contacted by a mage named Feron. Feron worships the legendary Phoenix, so his daydream-like visions prompts the Phoenix to adopt the fiery bird's form. He asks the Phoenix to help him by lending its energy to project a lighthouse-like stone pillar across the multiverse. The pillar later becomes the lighthouse base for the British superhero team Excalibur. Afterwards, Necrom attacks Feron to steal the power of the Phoenix. Strengthened by the Phoenix Force, Feron is able to fight back, but Necrom steals a fraction of the Phoenix Force's essence, forcing it to flee back to space in agonized confusion.

In the late fifteenth or early sixteenth century, Yu-Ti of K'un-L'un has visions of the Phoenix coming to Earth and of a red-headed Iron Fist who would confront it. In one vision, she loses control and destroys the world; in another, she tames its power. When walking the streets, Yu-Ti comes across Fongji Wu, the daughter of a woman who had ventured to the outside world and lain with a man from beyond K'un-Lun. After defeating Shou-Lao and becoming the Iron Fist, Fongji confronts the Phoenix Force and becomes its host. The Phoenix Force attempts to overwhelm Fongji and turn her into a Dark Phoenix, but she resists the being's control. Determining that she needed to leave Earth to prevent the possibility of losing control, Fongji ventures off into space, never to be seen again.

Jean Grey
Centuries later, the Phoenix Force returns to Earth without a host when it feels the mind of a human transcend the physical realm and resonate with its energy. A young Jean Grey telepathically linked her mind to her dying friend, Annie Richardson, to keep Annie's soul from moving to the afterlife. In doing so, Jean's mind is dragged along to the "other side" with Annie. Phoenix lends its energy to break the connection, and keeps a close watch on her because it felt a kinship with the young mutant. Years later, when Jean is dying on a space shuttle, her mind calls out for help and the Phoenix Force answers and saves her, transforming Jean into the Phoenix.

The Phoenix remains with the X-Men for only a short time. She prevents the complete destruction of the universe by repairing the damaged energy matrix at the core of the M'Kraan Crystal. During a skirmish with Magneto, Phoenix and Beast are separated from the other X-Men, each group believing the other to have perished. In Greece, Phoenix meets a man named Nikos, later revealed to be Mastermind, a mutant that can alter the perceptions of others. He plants seeds of dissent within Phoenix's fragile psyche by comparing her to a god and insisting she could do whatever she wished. She encounters him again in Scotland under the guise of Jason Wyngarde, believing him to be both the work of the reality-warping mutant Proteus and the lover of one of her ancestors.

After an encounter with the Hellfire Club and manipulation by Mastermind and the White Queen, the Phoenix is transformed into their Black Queen. She breaks free of Mastermind's control, but transforms into Dark Phoenix. She battles the X-Men, flees to the stars, devours the energies of the D'Bari star system to satisfy her "hunger" as Dark Phoenix, annihilates the five billion inhabitants of its fourth planet, and destroys a nearby Shi'ar observatory vessel that opens fire on her before she returns to Earth. There, Dark Phoenix is defeated in psionic combat by Professor X, and Jean Grey regains control. The X-Men, along with Phoenix, are teleported to space by the Shi'ar and given a trial by combat. Just as victory seemed certain for the Imperial Guard, Jean becomes Dark Phoenix again. She apparently commits suicide on Earth's moon before Cyclops.

As originally written, the Jean Grey incarnation of the Phoenix is Jean herself, having attained her ultimate potential as a psi, becoming a being of pure energy and reforming herself as Phoenix, only to become slowly corrupted by the manipulation of such foes as Mastermind and Emma Frost; unable to adapt to her enormous power, Jean is driven mad.

To return Jean to the fold several years later, this storyline was retconned to reveal the existence of the cosmic Phoenix Force entity, which had created a duplicate body of Jean, believed itself to be Jean and acted in her place while the real Jean lay in a healing cocoon at the bottom of Jamaica Bay, where the Avengers and Fantastic Four discover her. It allowed Jean to be revived as a member of X-Factor. The extent to which the duplicate and Jean are separate entities depends on who is writing the characters at the time: some instances portray them as inherently separate, while others demonstrate a shared consciousness.

After committing suicide, the Phoenix Force reaches the Hot White Room where it encounters a manifestation of Death and returns itself to Jean in the cocoon. Horrified by what it has done, Jean rejects it and it fuses with Jean's clone, Madelyne Pryor. This portion of the Phoenix remains with Madelyne until she commits suicide while fighting Jean Grey before rejoining Jean's consciousness.

Rachel Summers
Another known possessor of the Phoenix Force is Rachel Summers, Scott Summers and Jean Grey's daughter from the Days of Future Past alternate future. The Phoenix Force bonds with Rachel, making her the next avatar of the Phoenix Force. Rachel is one of the longest reigning avatars of the Phoenix, and while she eventually adopts the uniform, she never becomes Dark Phoenix. Rachel has been referred by the entity as "The One True Phoenix".

During an encounter with Galactus, Rachel Summers—completely overtaken by the Phoenix Force—battles Galactus to save a planet he was preparing to devour. The Phoenix Force disrupts Galactus' feeding process and easily defeats him. Galactus accuses the Phoenix Force of hypocrisy and reveals to it that its existence in a corporeal state is sustained by robbing energy used to birth future generations. Realizing this to be true, the Phoenix vows to return to its prior existence of "touching all that is" while allowing an echo of its power to remain with Rachel's now-dominant consciousness.

Into the Future
Returning to Earth with all her memories, Rachel manages to return to the future she had come from. While she could not change her past, she and her teammates are able to change the directives of all the Sentinels of the era to preserve all life, ending the genocide that had prevailed for years. On the way back to her time, Captain Britain is lost in the timestream and Rachel is forced to switch places with him, as she does not belong in the timeline she had existed in. She emerges from the timestream about 1,900 years in the future and forms the Clan Askani, which is responsible for bringing her brother Nathan to their time to fight Apocalypse. She later encounters Diamanda Nero, Apocalypse's High Councilor and viceroy. She tries overpowering him, but is left powerless after being shortly bonded to the Phoenix Force.

Phoenix resurrection
As an interdimensional portal transports four villains from the 616 Marvel Universe into the Ultraverse dimension, the Phoenix Force is also pulled into the Ultraverse and critically damaged. Requiring a human host to recover, the Phoenix Force bonds with Prime then with Amber Hunt. Amber, unable to control the Phoenix Force's power, attacks her friends and would have destroyed the planet if the X-Men and new Ultra hero Foxfire had not arrived, who after a long battle are able to separate the Phoenix from Amber and send the cosmic entity back to the 616 universe.

Jean Grey begins to wear the same costume the Phoenix Force had worn, manifest Phoenix firebirds, and tap into its cosmic reserves several times, worrying Scott as he feared the Phoenix had returned until Jean temporarily loses her powers as a result of the Psi-War.

To help Psylocke after the Psi-War, Jean switches powers with her. Jean loses her telekinesis but her telepathy increases greatly. Jean begins to manifest "Phoenix raptors" that represent her telepathic powers "honed to their sharpest edge". As a result of the power switch, Jean temporarily displays a shadow astral form with a Phoenix symbol over her right eye.

Jean begins manifesting the Phoenix raptor, creating a rift between her own and Scott's relationship, and the entity starts to appear as another personality within Jean, having a conversation with Professor Xavier on its role in events to come. When the X-Man Xorn reveals himself to be a traitor who claimed to be Magneto, he traps Jean and Wolverine on Asteroid M, which is drifting closer to the Sun. Rather than watch Jean die a slow painful death, Wolverine tries to kill Jean, but he awakens the Phoenix Force within her. Using her incredible powers, Phoenix/Jean returns with Logan to New York City to face "Magneto". Xorn's last act is to kill Jean with an electromagnetic pulse.

Endsong and Warsong
The Phoenix Force returns to Earth during the mini-series X-Men: Phoenix – Endsong, where it resurrects Jean Grey from her grave. It is not long before she remembers what she has come for—Scott Summers. She needs to feed from the energy from his optic blasts, and, confused by her own emotions, thinks she is in love with Scott. She realizes Scott is in love with Emma Frost, former White Queen of the Hellfire Club and headmistress of the Xavier Institute for Higher Learning. Through a number of incidents, Jean manages to assert herself and gain control of the Phoenix Force with emotional support from the X-Men. Jean then declares that she and the Phoenix Force are truly one entity, have transcended into the White Phoenix of the Crown, signified by a new white and gold costume.

As a result of a Shi'ar attack on the Phoenix Force, the entity is in an incomplete state and Jean must search out the remaining parts of the Phoenix Force. The consequences of this were partially addressed in X-Men: Phoenix – Warsong in which a small part of the Phoenix Force joins with the Stepford Cuckoos. After nearly losing control to the Phoenix power, the Stepford Cuckoos develop a secondary mutation, where their hearts turned to diamond and they are able to imprison the piece of the Phoenix Force.

End of Greys
With the failed attack on the Phoenix Force that ended with Jean Grey escaping their suicide bomb attack and returned to the White Hot Room to restore herself, the Shi'ar still want to permanently prevent the ascension of the Phoenix Force. In hopes of eliminating the possibility of a new Omega-level psionic mutant becoming a host for the Phoenix Force, the Shi'ar sent a commando unit—the Death Commandos—with the purpose of wiping out the Grey genome and killing Quentin Quire to Earth. They arrived at Rachel's family reunion site and kill all the members of the Grey family, except Rachel, who was marked, and Cable, who was not present. Afterward, at the graves of the Grey family, Rachel vows revenge on the Shi'ar and says: "I'm not my mom. I'm not the Phoenix. I'm my own woman. And by the time I'm done... they'll wish I WERE the Phoenix."

Kingbreaker
In the last issue of Kingbreaker, the Phoenix abandons Rachel and Korvus during battle with Vulcan's new guard, leaving them both without its power. As it leaves Rachel mutters "Please, not now... Mom." implying that Jean is calling back the missing pieces of the Phoenix Force, and perhaps planning another resurrection. Rachel later says that it was almost like the Phoenix was never with her for she "[c]an't feel it... I can't hear it...It's like it was never there."

The Sisterhood
Around the same time in San Francisco, the Red Queen and her Sisterhood attack the X-Men; first trapping Emma in a psychic barricade by Lady Mastermind. Inside what appears to be the White Hot Room, a woman resembling Jean Grey appears to Emma and helps her break free of Regan's influence with what appears to be a miniature version of the Phoenix energy raptor to let her help Logan, who has been robbed of a lock of Jean's hair that was in his possession. Madelyne uses the hair sample to locate Jean's gravesite, and then attempts to repeat a resurrection ritual with her corpse, but Cyclops had ordered Domino to substitute the body for someone else's and it causes Madelyne to either discorporate or become absorbed into the fake.

Utopia
During a conflict with several Predators X (genetically engineered mutant hunters), the Stepford Cuckoos are overwhelmed and knocked unconscious as the fragment of the Phoenix they captured forcefully escape from the girls' diamond hearts.

Second Coming
During the final confrontation with Bastion, Hope Summers turns into what appears to be the Phoenix and blasts Bastion, who manages to grasp Hope's neck. Hope touches the ground, goes full Phoenix Force, and blasts Bastion and the dome.
Later at a celebratory bonfire, Emma notices the flames around Hope take the shape of the Phoenix and Emma recalls the Sisterhood attack where the woman resembling Jean freed her from Lady Mastermind's illusion.

Generation Hope
While fighting the fifth so-called "Light", who was out of control, Hope attempts to take some of his powers only to exhaust herself and collapses. She is contacted by the Phoenix Force who refers to Hope as her "child", and that the other lights needed her. Hope regains consciousness and goes back to face Kenji Uedo.

Age of X
The Age of X reality is created when Legion's mind reacted to Doctor Nemesis's attempt to restore its sanity. In this reality, Jean Grey's Phoenix Force ability causes a tremendous amount of destruction and death in Albany. Although she was presumed deceased when the Air Force bombs the area, a new phoenix shape emerges from the rubble. Under the name of Revenant, it is not known whether she is Jean Grey (presumably dead after the Albany incident) or a new incarnation. She joins Magneto and becomes part of the Force Warriors.

When the truth about the Age of X is revealed, Legion apologizes to everyone before rewriting the universe and putting everything back the way it was. However, Revenant is also brought back to Utopia. Later, as all mutants begin to regain their true memories, Revenant is revealed to be the mind of Rachel Summers given human form.

Fear Itself
During the Fear Itself storyline, the Phoenix Force appears to Emma Frost. The Phoenix mocks her, saying that Scott Summers would never love her as he loved Jean Grey. It seems to be a side effect of when Emma invaded Juggernaut's mind and began feeding into Emma's fears. As the Phoenix convinces Emma that Hope is Jean reincarnated, it tells Emma that she knows what to do. Emma, in a trance-like state, takes her pillow and is about to smother her to death, but Namor intervenes.

Avengers vs. X-Men

During the Avengers vs. X-Men storyline, the event has the Phoenix Force returning to Earth, presumably to reclaim Hope Summers, which leads to a confrontation between the Avengers and the X-Men on how to deal with its arrival. The Avengers anticipate the destruction that the Phoenix could bring while Cyclops hopes to use the Phoenix Force to restart the mutant population.

As the Phoenix Force nears Earth, the Avengers fight the X-Men on the Blue Area of the Moon with Hope caught in the middle, while Iron Man and Giant-Man prepare a disruptor weapon to kill the Phoenix Force. Iron Man pilots the weapon against the Phoenix Force, but when he uses it to blast the Phoenix Force, the entity is forcefully altered and divided into five fragments that bond with Cyclops, Emma Frost, Namor, Colossus and Magik. They defeat the Avengers and head back to Earth with Hope. It is theorized that Scarlet Witch's spell of "No more mutants" angered the Phoenix, and to calm the entity, a new host was needed along, with five acolytes, to succeed at bringing about evolution (the acolytes were actually revealed to be the first five new mutants that have appeared around the globe since the decimation of the mutant population), and that was the reason the Phoenix came to Earth.

When the Avengers defeat Namor in an attack on Wakanda, his portion of the Phoenix Force becomes divided between the other four members of the "Phoenix Five", making it harder to defeat them. Spider-Man then baits Colossus and Magik into taking each other out by playing off of their fears when fighting them in a volcano, forcing their portions of the Phoenix to be divided between Emma and Cyclops. When Cyclops invades the mystical city of K'un Lun, Lei Kung defends the city on the back of the immortal dragon Shou-Lao the Undying, and reveals it had defeated the Phoenix in a past incarnation. While Cyclops defeats the dragon, Hope is able to absorb its power and defeat Cyclops who then goes to seek the other remaining portion of the Phoenix Force possessed by Emma Frost. Emma had been using the Phoenix Force to control all of Utopia, read the thoughts of everyone on the planet, take vengeance on anyone who had ever harmed a mutant, and dismantle all Sentinels. Cyclops defeats Emma and elevates to the level of Dark Phoenix, killing Professor X in the process.

In the final issue, the X-Men and the Avengers battle the Dark Phoenix, but they are losing as the Dark Phoenix starts to burn the world. As a last resort, Captain America sends in Hope and Scarlet Witch, who together manage to take down the Dark Phoenix, while Jean Grey appears within Cyclops' mind and convinces him to let go of the Phoenix Force. The Phoenix escapes Cyclops' body and enters Hope Summers'. Together, Hope and the Scarlet Witch wish away the Phoenix Force and the damage it caused, in the process activating the X-gene that allows the creation of new mutants around the world.

Even with the Phoenix gone, its effects remain in various ways, with four of the former Phoenix Five—Cyclops, Emma Frost, Colossus and Magik—suffering from various problems with their powers as well as Magneto, due to his prolonged time on Utopia. Cyclops and Magneto's control over their abilities regress back to the level of control that they had possessed in their first appearances, Emma Frost retains her diamond form but only has erratic control over her telepathy, and Colossus' body fluctuates between his organic and his metal parts rather than completely transforming into one or the other. While Magik's powers initially appeared to have been increased to the point where she can channel the power of Limbo on her own, a confrontation with Dormammu reveals that her new power is destroying Limbo each time she used it. It is later revealed that the power disruptions experienced by Cyclops, Emma, Colossus, Magik and Magneto were actually the result of nano-sentinels unleashed on them by Dark Beast.

Simultaneously, while spending some time in deep space, Iron Man helps defend an ancient planet from space pirates. He is later confronted by robotic police officers looking to arrest him for deicide. Before he is able to escape the planet, Iron Man realizes that the planet's people, known as the Voldi, worship the Phoenix Force and his hand in its disappearance has angered them.

Time Runs Out and Secret Wars
At some point during the Time Runs Out storyline, Cyclops acquires a Phoenix Egg that he holds in reserve, hoping to use it to end the Incursions.

During the Secret Wars storyline, Cyclops stands on top of the Phoenix Egg during the incursion between Earth-616 and Earth-1610. Cyclops uses it to become one with the Phoenix Force again, and uses his powers to decimate the Children of Tomorrow. After the realities collapse together, the Phoenix-Cyclops was one of the few survivors to come through the Incursion with a full memory of what had come before, proclaiming that resurrection was the goal of their mission. He is killed by God Emperor Doom in a subsequent confrontation.

All New, All Different Marvel
It has since been revealed that thousands of years ago, the civilization of planet Maveth was able to create a bomb that, when used, scorched the entire surface of the planet, killing all life within a generation; however, a second bomb is discovered by Gamora and Kitty Pryde to be hidden in the tomb of Maveth's king, which in turn is also being sought by the Chitauri. To Kitty's surprise, the bomb is actually an artifact that contained a fragment of the Phoenix Force. To escape from the Chitauri alive, Kitty accidentally activates the bomb, which kills the Chitauri and apparently releases the fragment of the Phoenix Force into the Universe again.

The deities of the Shi'ar, Sharra and K'ythri, can summon the entity at will and consider itself as their sister.

Under unknown circumstances, Terrax the Tamer acquires a Phoenix Egg and stores it on his warship. Thane deceives his allies (the Champion, Starfox and Nebula) into helping him invade Terrax's warship to steal the egg. After being shot and killed by Nebula, Thane opens the egg and become the new host of the Phoenix. Using his new powers, Thane defeats his own father and conquers the Black Quadrant. Thane finds Thanos and fights him, causing them both to fall into the entrance to the God Quarry. Inside, the Coven senses the Phoenix Force inside of Thane and separates it from him so that Thane can fight his father as the man he truly is. The Phoenix Force flies off and presumably leaves the God Quarry.

Psych War
While on a solo mission against the Wrecking Crew, teenaged Jean receives a vision that the Phoenix Force is coming back to Earth. Determined to not succumb to the fate that befell her adult counterpart, Jean tries to fight the future and forge her own destiny. When the Phoenix arrives, Jean, backed by a host of former Phoenix Force wielders, tries to defy destiny and stop the Phoenix before it can take her over. While she is able to wound the Phoenix with the aid of Cable's Psi-mitar, the Phoenix seems just too strong for anyone to overcome. Jean eventually pushes the cosmic force far away from her friends and allies, where a final battle can take place. It is revealed the Phoenix wants the adult Jean, but to do that it needs the younger Jean out of the way. The force floods her body with flaming psychic energy, incinerating her from the inside out, leaving only a skeleton.

Phoenix Resurrection: The Return of Jean Grey
Strange psychic occurrences around the world, which include a large bird flaring out from the sun and an explosion on the moon, raises red flags for the X-Men, who quickly launch an investigation on these events. After a string of bizarre encounters with familiar enemies, many of them considered deceased, the X-Men come to one conclusion: the Phoenix Force is back on Earth. The X-Men also discover that psychics are going missing or falling ill, which prompts the team to investigate Jean Grey's grave. They find her coffin empty, and race to locate the Phoenix Force before it can find a suitable host. With the time-displaced teen Jean Grey out of the Phoenix Force's way, the cosmic entity had resurrected the present adult Jean Grey. However, she does not recall her life as a mutant and an X-Man, and terrible visions from her previous life leave Jean unsure of the differences between reality and fiction. The X-Men theorize that the strange psychic occurrences are subconscious cries for help made by Jean Grey, and they must try to stop the Phoenix Force from merging with her. Old Man Logan is able to make Jean Grey remember her true life and as she learns about the fate of her family and several friends. Jean faces the Phoenix Force and is finally able to convince the cosmic entity to stop bringing her back as its avatar and to let her go. Alive once again, Jean is reunited with her friends as the Phoenix Force journeys back into space.

Returning to Earth
Namor, embittered by the surface world's reckless disregard for his underwater kingdom, beckons the Phoenix Force to Earth and vows to sacrifice every part of himself to reunite with the entity once more. Namor proposes that if the Phoenix helps him destroy the Avengers, then he will help it set the galaxies ablaze. The Phoenix chooses Moon Knight as its new host instead, allowing him to escape Khonshu's sway, but also provides him with a tremendous amount of power that is problematic considering Moon Knight's mental instability. As the Fist of the Phoenix, Moon Knight rejects Khonshu as his master, uppercutting Khonshu with the full might of the Phoenix Force, sending him crashing back down to Earth and losing his hold over Thor's hammer Mjolnir as well. Moon Knight declares that the new age will now belong to him instead. Once on the ground, Black Panther and Ghost Rider get to work, calling back the Spirit of Vengeance, Iron Fist and Eye of Agamotto out of Khonshu's grasp. With that, the Avengers assemble and Khonshu's forces weaken. However, Moon Knight is still floating up in the atmosphere, reacting and dwelling on the new power that now lies within him. The voices in Moon Knight's head suggest that if he were to burn the world with the Phoenix Force, the parasite of humanity would be purged and he would be a hero that saved the world. At this point, Moon Knight understands that he has lost his mind. After he reignites the sun and Thor breaks free from his entrapment with his hammer, Moon Knight almost welcomes the beating he gets from Thor, and the Phoenix Force subsequently leaves him as its host. Instead of returning to space, the Phoenix remains on Earth with Jean Grey deducing it is searching for a new avatar.

Enter the Phoenix
Having made a nest near Avengers Mountain at the North Pole, Namor and the Defenders of the Deep attempt to take the entity by force, leading to a battle with the Avengers and Agents of Wakanda. However, the Phoenix decides to hold a contest to judge who would be worthy to become its next host. The entity selects Captain America and Doctor Doom as its first combatants, who are empowered by a small spark of the Phoenix's cosmic fire and transported to the Savage Land for their match. Realizing that the Phoenix refuses to let Rogers die for unknown reasons, Doom forfeits, refusing to play into the cosmic entity's game. As Doom is returned, Captain America is transported to the White Hot Room where he encounters other competitors chosen by the Phoenix being held in wait for the next match. The Phoenix grants each competitor a vestige of its power and sends them to different parts of the world to fight each other. During the tournament, the essence of Lady Phoenix attempts to goad Black Panther into becoming the entity's next host, but is rebuked by him. As the tournament continues, the remaining Avengers and their allies attempt to keep the Phoenix at bay. During a confrontation with Thor, the Phoenix reveals that she is his biological mother, which confuses and enrages him. At the tournament's conclusion, Echo is chosen as the Phoenix's new host. As Jean Grey telepathically consoles and congratulates Echo, three Phoenix chicks are seen next to the infant Starbrand's crib at Avengers Mountain

Phoenix Song: Echo
While Maya fully accepts being the Phoenix Force's host, her first outing as the Phoenix does not go according to plan. While stopping a burglary, she loses control of her temper and burns one of the perpetrators alive before starting a fire that threatens to harm countless innocent people. Even Echo's behavior along with her attitude and body language shifts dramatically when being influenced by the Phoenix Force, prompting Elektra and Forge to confront her over the dangers of her powers. She rejects their condescending nature and admonishments but still recognizes that she needs help reigning in her powers.

Hosts
The following are the known hosts of the Phoenix Force:

 Jean Grey: The most powerful and complete Phoenix Force and host combination. Together they became the White Phoenix of the Crown. Death has stated that Jean is the rightful owner of the Phoenix Force and the embodiment of the Phoenix. Jean is later revived to be a full host for the Phoenix Force, but she convinces the cosmic entity to stop repeatedly resurrecting her, and let her go so she could live as she wanted.
Time-Displaced Jean Grey: Hosts a spark of the Phoenix that allows her to be transported to the White Hot Room. The Phoenix Force kills her as it does not consider her a true host, since Jean had conspired against the Phoenix from the beginning. The Phoenix Force was, however, forced to resurrect the Time-Displaced Jean Grey to expel her from the White Hot Room.
 Rook'shir: A Shi'ar that wields the Phoenix Force through the Blade of the Phoenix. He almost decimates the Shi'ar Empire.
 Feron: Ancestor of the modern-day Feron whose daydream-like visions prompt the Phoenix to adopt the firebird form.
 Necrom: Steals a fraction of the Phoenix Force from Feron that is later known as the Anti-Phoenix.
Anti-Phoenix: A corpse that was animated and incubates the fraction of the Phoenix Force that Necrom stole from Feron, along with a portion of his own life essence for future use.
 Fongji: Host who lived in K'un-Lun centuries ago and was trained in the Iron Fist. The previous guardians of K'un-Lun decided to keep her existence and the Phoenix Force's connection to the legacy of the Iron Fist a secret until its next return. Her name means bird of fire.
 Madelyne Pryor: A clone of Jean Grey that is brought to life by a fraction of the Phoenix Force. Sinister later creates six clones to take the energies from the Phoenix Five (Cyclops, Emma Frost, Colossus, Namor, and Magik), and while they manage to siphon some of the energy from the Phoenix, the entity burns away the Madelyne clones and frees the Phoenix Five, who then incinerate Mister Sinister and his city.
 Rachel Summers: The daughter of Jean Grey and Scott Summers from an alternate timeline who has been referred to as "The One True Phoenix". Rachel is the longest Earth-born host of the Phoenix and has never become Dark Phoenix. She mysteriously loses her connection to the fragment of the "blue" Phoenix within her, while at the same time the "hound" markings reappear on her face.
 Professor X: Charles Xavier briefly possesses an echo of the Phoenix Force during his time with the Starjammers.
 Diamanda Nero: The alleged daughter of Apocalypse from the Askani timeline and briefly becomes the host of the Phoenix after her fight with Rachel. She is unable to contain the Phoenix and begs Rachel to release it from her. Rachel releases the Force into the cosmos, depowering Nero in the process.
 Prime: Prime is briefly possessed by the Phoenix Force while it is in the Malibu Universe.
 Amber Hunt: Amber is possessed by the Phoenix Force while it is in the Malibu Universe and retains her Phoenix-enhanced power levels even after the entity returns to Earth-616. She loses this power enhancement when Maxis absorbs the Phoenix energy and uses it to permanently stabilize its humanoid shape without the need for a host body.
 Foxfire: Foxfire siphons some of the energy from the Phoenix while it is in the Malibu Universe and has a small portion of the Phoenix Force bonded to her at a sub-atomic level.<ref>Phoenix Resurrection: Revelations</ref>
 Quentin Quire: Quentin reconstitutes his body using a fragment of the shattered Phoenix Force when it comes to Earth, but it leaves him to his "sickness". He later becomes the host of the Phoenix Force during the "Asgard/Shi'ar War", and is asked to become the New God of the Shi'ar as the Phoenix. This arrangement apparently does not last as Quentin is seen on Earth possessing only a shard of the Phoenix Force. He relinquishes it to save Jubilee from certain death.
 Emma Frost: Emma Frost has become the host for the Phoenix Force on two occasions. In the first instance she is unable to contain it, stating that she is not "strong" enough. Greg Pak later elaborated on this in an interview after the second series X-Men: Phoenix – Warsong that "perhaps the Phoenix requires a willingness to open oneself up or give oneself away" in a way that Emma at the time could not, which was why Celeste Cuckoo was the only Emma Frost clone to truly become Phoenix. She later becomes a true host to the Phoenix (see Phoenix Five).
 Stepford Cuckoos: The group possesses a fraction of the Phoenix Force that they imprison inside of their diamond hearts. The Cuckoos later lose their connection to the Phoenix fragment, as the fragment escapes their diamond hearts without a known destination.
 Korvus: Descendant of Rook'shir and wielder of the Blade of the Phoenix. The Blade is powerless after the connection to the Phoenix fragment is lost.
 Captain Marvel: Resurrected by a fragment of the Phoenix Force. He later willingly allows the Phoenix to reclaim the fragment, which kills him in the process.
 The Phoenix Five: During the Avengers vs. X-Men storyline, the Phoenix Force approaches Earth, but Iron Man and Giant-Man use a disruptor weapon that alters the entity and divides it into five fragments that forcefully bonds with:  
Namor: Possesses a fragment of the Phoenix Force, and loses it after being defeated by the Avengers.
 Magik: Possesses a fragment of the Phoenix Force that leaves her after Spider-Man baits her and Colossus into taking each other out.
 Colossus: Possesses by a fragment of the Phoenix Force that leaves him after Spider-Man baits him and Magik into taking each other out.
 Emma Frost: Possesses a fragment of the Phoenix Force, who refers to Frost as its "beloved child" after she alerts it to Mister Sinister's plot. Her half of the Phoenix Force is later stolen by Cyclops to increase his power during the final battle with the Avengers and X-Men.
 Cyclops: Possesses a fragment of the Phoenix Force, and is the last of the Phoenix Five to fall under the corrupted influence of the Phoenix Force. He becomes Dark Phoenix after hosting all five fragments, but Jean Grey's essence convinces him to let the Phoenix leave his body as he is attacked by Hope Summers and the Scarlet Witch. He later acquires the Phoenix Egg, and uses it to become one with the Phoenix Force to decimate the Children of Tomorrow during the incursion between Earth-616 and Earth-1610. He retains the Phoenix after the remaining universes crash together, but loses it when he is killed by Doctor Doom. The Phoenix Force temporarily resurrects Cyclops to convince Jean Grey to accept the entity, but is returned to the dead when she refused. An alternate version of Cable makes arrangements to place a device near Cyclops' heart that siphons some of the Phoenix's energy when it resurrected him to allow his rebirth.
 Hope Summers: According to Cable and later confirmed by the Scarlet Witch, she is the incarnation of the Phoenix Force itself, which explains her resemblance to Jean Grey, and for that same reason, is able to relinquish its powers. Hope and the Phoenix temporarily become the White Phoenix.
 Thane: The half-Inhuman son of Thanos, the Mad Titan. He becomes a host of the Phoenix Force after his death and subsequent rebirth hatches a Phoenix Egg. He loses his connection to the Phoenix when the Coven separates it from him when he and his father have one last fight in the God Quarry.
 Lady Phoenix: As an infant during prehistoric times, Firehair is abandoned by her parents at the Burnt Place because of her red hair. A pack of wolves take her in and she grows up a feral child. She later encounters a child with one eye called Highwalker, and joins the Tribe Without Fear, which consists of prehistoric mutants. Firehair's mutant abilities  manifest as she warns the Tribe Without Fear about an upcoming attack by the xenophobic tribes. After Firehair faints, the Tribe Without Fear and the xenophobic tribes kill each other. Firehair blames herself after recovering and returns to the Burnt Place to await death. The Phoenix Force, which created the Burnt Place, arrives and saves her while bonding with her. Consumed by the rage of the Tribe Without Fear's death, Firehair starts to become the Dark Phoenix and is only pacified by the wolf that saved her as an infant. Years later, Firehair becomes Lady Phoenix and seeks out Odin to form 1,000,000 B.C.'s version of the Avengers with other mystically enhanced beings. Its only known fight is with an out-of-control Celestial called the Fallen. The Stone Age Avengers defeat the Fallen and seal it underground in what would become South Africa. It is implied she and Odin shared a romantic relationship during this time, and that Thor had born from that relationship. For reasons unknown the Phoenix Force keeps Firehair's consciousness suppressed in the White Hot Room, but she isable to exert a degree of subconscious influence over it, causing it to instinctively seek out hosts from Earth, with a preference for red-haired women with psionic abilities, but is apparently released when Time-Displaced Jean Grey reaches the White Hot Room, as Firehair is seen with other avatars battling the young mutant. 
 Chosen Champions of the Phoenix: During the Enter the Phoenix storyline, the Phoenix Force holds a tournament to judge who its next host will be, choosing many participants from around the world, empowering each of them with a portion of its power and pitting them in trials by combat, with the eliminated contestants losing its power. For the tournament, the Phoenix chooses: 
 Doctor Doom: The only one of the chosen to realize the Phoenix had its own inscrutable agenda, forfeiting his match against Captain America when he correctly deduces that the Phoenix was not looking for his particular character traits.
 Man-Thing: Is defeated by Black Panther in combat.
 Luke Cage: Is defeated by American Eagle in combat.
 Moon Girl and Devil Dinosaur: While Moon Girl does not receive a spark of the cosmic flame, Devil Dinosaur is made a temporary host. Both are eliminated when Devil Dinosaur is defeated by Shanna the She-Devil and Zabu.
 The Orb: Is defeated by Valkyrie in combat.
 Hyperion: Due to the Phoenix's power overloading his super senses to unbearable pain, Hyperion immediately forfeits his match against Shang-Chi.
 Howard the Duck: Is defeated by Red Widow in combat.
 Nighthawk: Despite fighting Black Panther to a standstill, the Phoenix declares Black Panther the winner, eliminating Nighthawk from the tournament.
 Shang-Chi: With the support of most of the remaining participants, Captain America realizes Shang-Chi is the best suited candidate to wield the Phoenix's power and arranges for Shang-Chi to win their match while training him to contain his power. Angered by Rogers' sabotage and Shang-Chi's refusal to kill, the Phoenix eliminates Shang-Chi and forces Captain America to advance to the next round.
 Wolverine: Is defeated by Black Panther in combat.
 Valkyrie: Is defeated by She-Hulk in combat.
 Black Knight: Is defeated by Red Widow in combat.
 American Eagle: Is defeated by Shanna the She-Devil and Zabu in combat.
 Red Widow: Her fight with Shanna the She-Devil and Zabu is interrupted by Echo, who burns Red Widow with cosmic fire while extracting her portion of the Phoenix's power.
 Shanna the She-Devil and Zabu: Their fight with Red Widow is interrupted by Echo, who peacefully takes their portion of the Phoenix's power from them.
 Namor: His fight with She-Hulk is interrupted by Echo, who brutally attacks him as payback for her earlier defeat by his hands while extracting his portion of the Phoenix's power from him.
 She-Hulk: Her fight with Namor is interrupted by Echo, who peacefully takes her portion of the Phoenix's power from her.
 Captain America: His fight with Black Panther is interrupted by Echo, who peacefully takes his portion of the Phoenix's power from him.
 Black Panther: His fight with Captain America is interrupted by Echo, who peacefully takes his portion of the Phoenix's power from him.
 Echo: Despite being defeated and left for dead by Namor under the Atlantic Ocean in an earlier match, the Phoenix was drawn to Echo's suffering and refusal to die, ultimately choosing her to be its next host. After resurfacing from the ocean, Echo intercepted the last fights and absorbed the Phoenix's remaining vestiges from the last participants.
 Taaia: Taaia of Taa, from the Sixth Cosmos was briefly possessed by Phoenix when entering the White Hot Room after being mortally wounded in a fight with the Beyonders. It used her to separate and attack the rest of the Defenders, but America Chavez was able to keep her distracted with the Eternity Mask, while Tigra summoned the Phoenix's opposite, the Tiger God to attack it and free Taaia from its control.
 America Chavez: While fighting a Phoenix-possessed Taaia, she uses the Eternity Mask to steal a portion of it for herself. When Taaia's connection is severed by the Tiger God, America looses hers too.
 Dark Phoenix: While appearing to be a gold-skinned woman in a robe, she would later be revealed to be a version of Mystique from King Thor's reality of Earth-14412.

Other characters were only possessed by the Phoenix Force during out-of-continuity tales, including Franklin Richards, Nightcrawler, Storm, Wolverine of Earth-14412 (referred to as Old Man Phoenix), King Thor of Earth-14412, Cosmic Ghost Rider, and Gabriel Summers in separate What If... stories, as well as Cyclops in the X-Men/Teen Titans inter-company crossover. Quentin Quire is revealed to be a host in the Here Comes Tomorrow storyline and in the visions of Deathlok, and in the timeline of Nocturne, the Phoenix Force possesses Colossus' soulless body and reshapes it into a female form.

Powers and abilities
The Phoenix Force can manipulate cosmic energies and tap into the life-force reserved for future generations, which denies their existence. It can wield this energy to project beams of immense destructive force. It can migrate throughout time and space by folding its energy back into itself, causing it to collapse akin to a black hole and then reform itself upon reaching its destination. It can directly absorb offensive energy such as Cyclops' optic blasts or the energy and life-force from a foe. As it is the nexus of all psionic energy, it has mental abilities on a cosmic level, including telepathy and telekinesis.

It allows its preferred host to perform cosmic pyrokinesis, as it allows Lady Phoenix from 1,000,000 BC Avengers to summon preternatural flames that can melt supernovas. For Jean Grey, it allows her to perform cosmic pyrokinesis strong enough to easily defeat Terrax, as she is in complete control of her own cosmic fire that after Terrax submits to his defeat, the fire dissipates at her will leaving him charred. She also uses the cosmic fire blast to counter Galactus. In some conditions, a bit of cosmic fire can easily burn anything it comes into contact, as when it possesses young Jean Grey she unconsciously melts the equipment the medics try to put on her.

The extent of the Phoenix Force's abilities has not been fully clarified. Jean Grey as The White Phoenix of the Crown is able to change the future of a universe by reaching back in time and urging Cyclops to move on with his life.

Another major display of the power of the Phoenix is during the Secret Wars II. Rachel Summers seeks to kill the Beyonder, who expresses both amazement and disappointment in her. With that, the Beyonder gives Rachel full access to the power of the Phoenix as well as some of his own. With such power, Rachel is able to absorb the consciousness of every sentient mortal being in the universe.

The Phoenix often seeks hosts with strong inherent psionic abilities so they can withstand its power. When the Phoenix Force enters a host, a small fragment of its power is left behind when it leaves. Even a small fragment can be stronger than an inexperienced host using the Phoenix Force's powers, such as with Rachel Summers, who has full access to the Force, but her opponent Necrom threw moons at her with only a fragment. When bonded with a host, the Phoenix Force amplifies their abilities to incalculable levels. It can manipulate matter on a sub-atomic level and transmute elements, like turning wood to gold or stone to crystal; on a smaller scale, it can alter the molecular fabrics. It can teleport others across space and open interdimensional portals to instantly access distant portions of the Universe. If an avatar of the Phoenix Force is harmed or killed, it forms an "egg" of cosmic power around them that is incubated in the White Hot Room, and hatches out completely healed. As one of the oldest cosmic beings, the Phoenix Force possesses a high level of cosmic awareness and prescience.

 Cultural impact and legacy 

 Critical reception 
Tamara Jude of Sideshow stated, "The Phoenix Force holds a significant place in the Marvel Comics and stands as the most unforgettable element of X-Men member Jean Grey’s comic book history. This character-defining arc, known as the Phoenix Saga and the Dark Phoenix Saga, has resonated with fans for decades with its compelling plot vibrant panels and shocking ending. The legacy of the Phoenix Force stretches well beyond the pages of Marvel Comics. The Dark Phoenix Saga is regarded as one of the best comic book arcs in history and has become a fan-favorite. It is also one of the favored arcs by comic book critics around the world." Tristan Benns of Screen Rant referred to the Phoenix Force as "one of the X-Men’s most iconic concepts," writing, "As a staple of Marvel Comics’ X-Men franchise, the Phoenix Force has been a fan-favorite concept well known to both heroes and readers alike for decades. But as long-lived and mysterious as the Phoenix is, it’s hard for anybody to ever truly know its full story." 

 Accolades 

 In 2006, Wizard ranked Jean Grey's Dark Phoenix persona 38th in their "100 Greatest Villains of All Time" list.
 In 2013, IGN ranked Jean Grey's Dark Phoenix persona 9th in their "Top 100 Comic Book Villains of All Time" list.
 In 2013, Complex ranked the Dark Phoenix 13th in their "25 Greatest Comic Book Villains of All Time" list.
 In 2018, CBR.com ranked the Phoenix Force 13th in their "25 Most Powerful Marvel Gods" list.
 In 2021, Bustle included the Phoenix Force in their "50 Most Powerful Characters In The Marvel Universe" list.
 In 2021, Screen Rant included the Phoenix Force in their "16 Most Powerful Cosmic Characters In Marvel Comics" list.
 In 2021, CBR.com ranked the Phoenix Force 10th in their "Marvel: The 10 Strongest Cosmic Entities" list and 14th in their "15 Strongest Marvel Gods" list.
 In 2020, OtakuKart ranked the Phoenix Force 10th in their "Top 10 Strongest Marvel Celestials" list.
 In 2022, Digital Trends ranked Jean Grey's Dark Phoenix persona 1st in their "10 most powerful X-Men villains" list.
 In 2022, Newsarama ranked Jean Grey's Dark Phoenix persona 10th in their "Best Marvel supervillains" list.
 In 2022, CBR.com ranked the Phoenix Force 5th in their "10 Greatest Threats The Avengers' Earth Has Faced" list.

Other versions
31st century

In the 31st century in the Guardians of the Galaxy comics series, ordinary human Giraud of New Haven becomes a host to the Phoenix Force. As Phoenix, Giraud is a rarity for a Phoenix host, since he is an ordinary human with no active magic or psionic abilities—only those powers granted him directly by the Phoenix Force. However, the Phoenix Force tells him that he has latent psi-abilities, and it was that latent psi-potential that drew it to him.

"Age of Apocalypse"
In the Age of Apocalypse reality, after Jean Grey's death at the hands of Havok, nuclear bombs set to destroy America are destroyed by Jean, awakened as the Phoenix (known as "Mutant Alpha", the legendary ultimate mutant). Sinister captures Phoenix and brainwashes her into becoming one of his Sinister Six. He turns Phoenix against the X-Men, displaying the personality of Dark Phoenix. Phoenix generates enough heat to nearly burn Sunfire to death, but Psylocke uses her psychic knife to bring her to her senses. Jean uses the Phoenix Force to incinerate her former master, and becomes leader of the X-Men in Magneto's absence.

Amalgam Comics
In Amalgam Comics, the Jean Grey incarnation of Phoenix with is combined with DC Comics character Fire to make Firebird in JLX #1. She is brainwashed into becoming the Dark Firebird. The Rachel Summers version of Phoenix was combined with Legion of Super-Heroes member Kinetix to make Phoenetix in Spider-Boy Team-Up #1.

Earth X
Although the origins and history of Phoenix of the Earth-X limited series match her Earth-616 counterpart, the Phoenix Force is originally a citizen of the first universe that existed before the Big Bang that created the current universe in which Earth-9997 resides. The original universe collapsed due to the manipulations and reproduction of the Celestial race. There are a number of survivors who were referred to as "The Elders of the Universe", the Phoenix Force being one of these elders. It is later revealed that the Elders plan to reunify the fragmented universe (and all its parallel universe and alternate history counterparts) through the Realm of the Dead and with the aid of Death.

The Phoenix Force is a part of the plot to reverse the damage the Celestials had already created. As the Elders were all nearly immortal and could not die, the Phoenix Force binds itself to Jean Grey. Unable to bind with her severely burned body, it becomes a binary being with her and assumes her identity, personality, and physical form, while sealing her charred body in a cocoon to heal. When the shuttle crashes the cocoon sinks to the bottom of Jamaica Bay, and the Phoenix Force takes Jean's place.

The Phoenix sacrifices her life and the real Jean Grey returns. The Phoenix ended up in Death's realm in Jean's form, and is one of the few beings in this realm that are aware they are dead. She joins Mar-Vel's army to battle Death and her army. During this time, Scott Summers is able to establish a mental rapport with the Phoenix and kept informed as to the goings-on in the Realm of the Dead and Mar-Vel's Paradise.

After the creation of Mar-Vel's Paradise, Phoenix becomes one of the Avenging Host, a group of former champions who are transmogrified by technology that belonged to the High Evolutionary. During her time as one of the Avenging Host, its members begin to doubt Mar-Vel's intentions. Their doubts in Mar-Vel's quest are strengthened when they realize that no new dead were appearing in Death's former realm. Phoenix relays this information to Scott, prompting the heroes of Earth-9997 to seek out Jude, the Entropic Man, to become the new Death. When Cap, 3-D Man, Comet Man, Benny Becksley, and Thanos learn that each "Paradise" created for the realms citizens is wish fulfillment, the Avenging Host helps free each citizen from their private "heaven" and resolve to confront Mar-Vel about his intentions.

The host and Rick Jones are summoned and put on trial by Mar-Vel. Confronted by Mar-Vel with Captain America, Phoenix and the rest of the host are killed by the leader when Cap refuses to take Mar-Vel's power. Shortly after their death, the Kree army invades Paradise and instigates a large battle. During the combat, Reed Richards arrives from the Negative Zone and confronts Mar-Vel. During their talk, Mar-Vel resurrects the Avenging Host to help the citizens of Paradise defeat the Kree invaders. After the battle's conclusion, Phoenix's whereabouts are unknown.

Heroes Reborn
In an alternate reality depicted in the miniseries Heroes Reborn, Maya Lopez becomes the Phoenix Force's host.Heroes Reborn vol. 2 #6 (June 2021). Marvel Comics.Heroes Return #1 (June 2021). Marvel Comics.

Legacy of Fire
In X-Men: Phoenix - Legacy of Fire, the Phoenix Force is also a weapon. The Phoenix Sword is guarded and wielded by the sorceress Madelyne Pyre, who inherits the sword from her mother. When Madelyne's time as wielder of the sword is almost over, she trains her little sister, Jena, to fight and use magic. When their reality's version of Shadow King steals the Phoenix Sword, Jena tried to reclaim it before being stabbed with the sword. The powers of the Phoenix Sword pass on to the dying Jena, who becomes the Phoenix Force's first host and vanquishes Shadow King before becoming the guardian of her dimension.

Marvel 1602
In Marvel 1602, Jean, who disguises herself as a man, dies of sickness on Carlos Javier's ship. As a funeral, this version of Angel carries Jean's corpse into the sky, where 1602 Cyclops burns her to ashes with his eye beams. The fire briefly forms a shape similar to the Phoenix before vanishing.

Marvel Zombies
Phoenix appears in the Marvel Zombies 2 mini-series. The zombie survivors of the first series, who now possess the powers of Galactus, are joined by other "cosmic level" zombies, including an unnamed Dark Phoenix who appears to be Jean Grey. She is responsible, along with the others, for eating most of the sentient life in the universe. A long trip back to Earth and leads to Jean and the others regaining their sense of morality and control over their hunger. Jean is destroyed by the Hulk.

Ultimate Marvel

In the Ultimate Marvel Universe, a young Jean Grey is placed in a mental institute after she hears voices and sees visions of an omnipotent Phoenix God. After her release, she thinks she contacted a celestial God-entity that destroyed worlds as well create life.

As a result, the Hellfire Club believes that it should summon the Phoenix and merge it with Jean via a ritual. While the ritual is successful, the Phoenix has different plans and kills the Hellfire Club. In the Hellfire and Brimstone arc, the Phoenix Force makes its first appearance as the entity within Jean's body. Jean gains some control over Phoenix at the expense of using dangerous amounts of its power and causing extreme destruction.

Charles Xavier is confronted by Lilandra Neramani, the leader of a religious group known as the Church of Shi'ar Enlightenment, who worship a god known as the Phoenix. As a result of their meeting, Lilandra asks to study Jean Grey to determine whether she is the embodiment of the Phoenix Force. During the examination, the Phoenix entity apparently asserts itself in an evil form but is seemingly suppressed by Professor Xavier's more experienced psychic powers and his emotional outreach to Jean Grey's normal personality.

After the suppression of what seems to be the Phoenix Force, Lilandra and Charles are informed by Gerald, Lilandra's assistant, that Jean tested negative. He reveals that Jean Grey's parents have a connection to the Shi'ar Church and postulates that her subconscious has manifested a false Phoenix persona after being subjected to Phoenix Force stories in her youth. Feeling that she has lost her mind, Jean slips into a depressed state and begins seeing green creatures latched on to her body. It is then revealed that Jean tested positive as the carrier of the Phoenix Force and Gerald has covered it up under orders from his actual superiors: the Hellfire Club.

Jean learns to control the powers of the Phoenix. When Apocalypse prepares to kill the time-displaced Xavier, Jean accepts the Phoenix, creating a humanoid fiery entity whose power is able to bring down the "ancient being". She alters reality completely and resets time to undo the damage done by Apocalypse and supposedly by Professor Xavier.

In Ultimate X-Men/Fantastic Four Annual #1, a teenage Franklin Richards is shown to be host to the Phoenix, and a member of that timeline's X-Men.

What If?
The Phoenix has been the subject of What If on a number of occasions.

 The timeline shown in What If? vol. 2 #32 and #33 diverged from the main timeline just before the Phoenix dies. Rather than committing suicide, the Phoenix is given a psychic lobotomy by the Shi'ar and returned to Earth with the X-Men to live as Jean Grey. Phoenix and Cyclops marry, and she gives birth to Rachel Summers. Phoenix refuses Magneto's offer to restore her powers, but eventually regains them in an encounter with Mastermind. In a fit of despair, Phoenix kills the real Jean Grey, who is lying in stasis at the bottom of the sea. When the rest of the X-Men discover that "Jean" has become the Phoenix again, she temporarily leaves before returning to save them from an attack by the Sentinels. Scott and Phoenix reconcile, but Destiny tells Phoenix that she only saw death in her future if she tried to remain among mortals. In response, the Phoenix leaves the Earth to wander the universe alone.
 The timeline shown in What If? vol. 2 #79 diverges from the main reality on the day the X-Men's shuttle passes through cosmic radiation during re-entry to Earth. Jean Grey is knocked out, so Storm volunteers to steer the capsule with her elemental powers. All of the X-Men except Wolverine die during the crash. Storm seemingly survives and emerges from the wreckage as Stormphoenix, displaying absolute control over all aspects of the weather. She erects a benevolent dictatorship on Earth, drawing young mutants to her side and freezing the super-beings who oppose her in the atmosphere. As she grows crueler and detached from humanity, the remaining heroes—as well as her acolyte, Kitty, and her mentor, Ahadi—plan to get rid of her. They examine the space capsule and find the real Storm, who had been placed in a healing cocoon and submerged in the Hudson Bay. Kitty takes over her body and they confront Stormphoenix as the fake she was. Shocked back to its senses, the Phoenix leaves Earth, but the real Storm dies in the process.
 The What If? X-Men: Rise and Fall of the Shi'ar Empire looks at what would have happened if Vulcan had inherited the powers of Phoenix via the M'Kraan Crystal. In this reality, Vulcan ends up inside the M'Kraan Crystal instead of Professor X. Through the M'Kraan Crystal, Vulcan ascends to the White Hot Room where he meets the Phoenix Corps, one of them being Kid Omega, who says that Vulcan does not belong there. Vulcan takes Kid Omega's powers. He slays all the Phoenix Corps and takes their power. He leaves the Crystal and takes the pieces of the Phoenix Force out of Rachel and Korvus. Wielding supposedly the full Phoenix Force, he destroys the Shi'ar Empire, Xavier, Nightcrawler, Polaris, Warpath, Darwin, the Starjammers, Gladiator and Lilandra. Only Rachel and Havok survive through a teleportation portal opened by Jean Grey. Vulcan destroys one third of the Annihilation Wave along with Annihilus himself. Nova pleads Ronan the Accuser to escape, but Vulcan destroys the Kree Empire. The Watchers comment that the Phoenix "consumed" a galaxy. Rachel and Havok arrive on Earth. They, along with Cyclops and Cable, engage Vulcan. The battle takes place on Krakoa. Vulcan begins to lose control during the battle. Rachel warns him that the Phoenix Force reacts poorly to negative emotions. The consequences of losing total control will not only consume himself but all of reality. Letting go of the rage and hate he holds, Vulcan halts his rampage and accepts his death. As Vulcan ascends to the White Hot Room, he meets Jean Grey, who is the White Phoenix of the Crown. He is comforted by Jean who jokingly tells him that she always had a soft spot for Summers men.

X-Men: No More Humans
In X-Men: No More Humans, Raze – the future son of Wolverine and Mystique who becomes trapped in the present — attempts to force the X-Men to accept his new status quo by teleporting all humans off of Earth and summoning other mutants from worlds where they are being oppressed, with one of them being a Jean Grey who maintained her Dark Phoenix state albeit under the control of her world's Mastermind. The present Grey confronts her time-displaced counterpart and appeals to her to help the X-Men undo Raze's actions and save the displaced humans. In the process, they create a new Earth in a pocket dimension for the refugee mutants.

Crossovers
Phoenix has appeared in the following intercompany crossovers:

 Dark Phoenix teamed up with Darkseid in The Uncanny X-Men and The New Teen Titans crossover between DC and Marvel Comics' respective teams. The story was made by Chris Claremont, Walt Simonson and Terry Austin in 1983. The story follows Darkseid conversing with Metron for the Anti-Life Equation at the edge of the Universe. Metron and Darkseid make a deal, and Dark Phoenix becomes part of that equation. The Teen Titans try to stop Darkseid, with the help of the X-Men, who later go head to head with Deathstroke the Terminator. The Dark Phoenix breaks free from Darkseid's grasp, is briefly hosted by Cyclops, and eventually dies again.
 The Phoenix Force is transported to the Ultraverse where it possessed the pyrokinetic ultra Amber Hunt. The X-Men, Ultraforce, Exiles, and numerous other characters team-up to stop the Phoenix from destroying the world.

In other media

Television

 The entire saga of the Phoenix is retold and adapted in the third season of the X-Men animated series, subdivided into the five-part "Phoenix Saga", in which Jean Grey acquires the power of the Phoenix and the battle for the M'Kraan Crystal occurs; and the "Dark Phoenix Saga", showcasing the battle with the Hellfire Club, the Phoenix Force's transformation into Dark Phoenix, and the battle to decide her fate. As the Phoenix Force retcon occurred before the creation of the series, the episodes were made with this change in mind—rather than have Jean develop her powers independently or be replaced by the cosmic Phoenix Force entity, the two concepts were merged: Jean's body is possessed by the Phoenix Force, leading to a struggle between two independent entities. Jean pilots a shuttle, and when her telekinetic shield fails Phoenix enters her body. Rather than destroying an inhabited system—which was the cause for the decision to kill off the character in the comics—the animated story had her destroy a deserted system and only disable the attacking Shi'ar cruiser. These changes made it possible for aspects of the original ending of Uncanny X-Men #137, in which Jean survives, to be used. Jean commits suicide (with the Shi'ar's laser beam instead of an ancient weapon), but with her death, the Phoenix Force is purified, and it uses its powers to resurrect Jean, drawing on the combined life-force of the assembled X-Men. Jean retains her original basic powers.
 The Phoenix Force makes a cameo appearance in the last episode of X-Men: Evolution. During a confrontation with Professor X as a Horsemen of Apocalypse, the Phoenix briefly forms from Jean Grey's shield during their psychic battle. Following Apocalypse's defeat, her other cameo is part of Professor X's glimpse of the future, and shows her host screaming out as the Phoenix.
 The Phoenix makes an appearance in Wolverine and the X-Men. The Phoenix Force is an entity that has afflicted psychic mutants since the Homo Superior race first appeared. It enters the host at birth and grows with it. Once they reach maturity, the Phoenix Force takes over the host to cause mass destruction. Emma Frost's own intent is to lure the Phoenix out of Jean Grey's body to put an end to the damage that it causes with help from the Hellfire Club and the Stepford Cuckoos. However, the Hellfire Club and the Stepford Cuckoos reveal their ulterior motives. It is also revealed that Jean caused the explosion at the Xavier Institute from transforming into the Phoenix because of the Hellfire Club's first attempt to take the Phoenix's power. Jean and Cyclops face the Phoenix, risking it devastating the planet and creating the future the X-Men had been trying to prevent, but Wolverine allows Emma to join the fight to seemingly sacrifice herself to stop the Phoenix by absorbing it into her body before turning into her diamond form and shattering herself into pieces. The Phoenix Force seemingly vanishes without a host.
 The Phoenix makes appearances in the beginning and final episodes of Marvel Anime: X-Men.

Films
 Famke Janssen plays Jean Grey in the first three movies. In X-Men, Jean uses Cerebro for the first time, which puts strain on both her mind and abilities, and is affected when Magneto tries to use a machine to turn the world leaders into mutants by said machine's destruction. 
 In X2, a fiery aura appears in Jean's eyes when using her powers, and she is engulfed in a fiery aura as she sacrifices herself to hold back a tsunami of water from a burst dam and lift the X-Jet to save the X-Men. In the final scene, a giant flaming bird-shaped object can be seen reflected in the water.

 The Phoenix appears in X-Men: The Last Stand. Having survived her supposed death, Jean becomes Dark Phoenix, the only known class five mutant. Her mutation is seeded in the unconscious part of her mind, and Professor X fears what could happen if she cannot control her near-infinite abilities. He uses his powers to build several psychic barriers in her mind at a young age to isolate most of her powers from her conscious mind, which causes a split in her psyche—Jean, whose limited powers were always in her control; and her dormant side, a purely instinctual, powerful creature that called itself the "Phoenix" with little to no regard toward anyone that Jean cares about. During the movie, with the psychic barriers removed by everything that Jean had gone through in the previous films, Phoenix is eventually able to gain dominance over Jean. Phoenix kills Scott Summers and  Professor X before joining Magneto. Phoenix abstains from the battle on Alcatraz until military reinforcements show up and try to shoot Jean; Phoenix gains full control and demolishes the island on the molecular level. Facing Phoenix alone, Wolverine calls to Jean. As Logan climbs to her, his flesh is repeatedly and painfully peeled from his adamantium-covered bones, the healing factor being the only thing keeping Logan alive. When Wolverine reaches Phoenix, it asks if Wolverine would die for the rest of humanity, to which he tells it and Jean that he would only die for her. His words pull Jean to the fore; unable to stop Phoenix, she tells Logan to save her. Wolverine stabs Jean with the claws, killing her and ending the destruction. Jean's tombstone lies on the X-Mansion ground, beside the markers of her slain teammates.
 Jean Grey appears in X-Men: Apocalypse, portrayed by Sophie Turner. Jean is one of the most ostracized of Charles Xavier's students because she struggles to control her powers as exhibited when she suffers a premonitory nightmare, shaking the school and causing Xavier strain as he tries to wake and calm her. In the film's climax during the X-Men's battle against Apocalypse, Charles tells Apocalypse in an astral battle ground that he is not the most powerful psychic. After bringing Jean there, Charles convinces her to unleash the full extent of her powers. She shatters Apocalypse's astral projection before disintegrating his physical body, her body surrounded by a flaming bird-shaped aura.
 Dark Phoenix loosely adapts The Dark Phoenix Saga. Jean loses control of her mental abilities and unleashes the Phoenix. While the original trilogy stated that the Phoenix was Jean's darker personality traits, Jean has some difficulties but has generally suppressed them since her childhood. When the X-Men go up to rescue the shuttle Endeavour from an apparent solar flare, Jean is left behind in the shuttle when the 'solar flare' strikes it, only for her body to absorb the energy. Jean is later contacted by Vuk, a member of the D'Bari, who claims that her world was destroyed by the "solar flare" that struck Jean. Vuk explains that it is actually a cosmic force of supreme power, a fragment of the energy of the universe itself, though only Jean has been able to contain and handle its immense power. Vuk attempts to encourage Jean to tap that power, allegedly to move beyond old standards, but really intends to absorb the power herself so that she can remake Earth for her people. With the X-Men's support, Jean is able to harness the power inside her and destroy the D'Bari forces, but subsequently departs Earth.

Video games
 In X-Men: Next Dimension, several of Jean Grey's powers take base from the Phoenix. The game also includes the Dark Phoenix separately as an unlockable bonus character. Her attacks are mainly related to the Phoenix Force. In the hidden cutscene "The Fury of Dark Phoenix", it is revealed that after Jean Grey/Phoenix successful defeats Bastion on Asteroid M, Cyclops transports to Asteroid M. Before Cyclops and Jean can re-unite, Bastion shoots a laser beam at Cyclops, instantly killing him, which causes the Dark Phoenix to manifest in Jean. As the Dark Phoenix, she destroys Asteroid M, Bastion, and presumably Wolverine and Magneto,. From the X-Mansion, Professor Xavier senses the Dark Phoenix. She transforms into her fiery bird form and destroys the moon before going on a rampage.
 In Spider-Man 2: Enter Electro, a costume called Spider-Phoenix represents Spider-Man as a host of the Phoenix Force. Although Spider-Man cannot use Phoenix's powers in game, the costume grants the player invulnerability, as well as greater strength and webswing speed.
 In X-Men Legends, Jean Grey appears as a playable character. One of her alternate costumes is a green and yellow/gold Phoenix costume. Her "X-treme attack" is "Phoenix Force". 
 In X-Men Legends II: Rise of Apocalypse, Jean Grey, who is a playable character, has some attacks related to the Phoenix Force, such as the ability to resurrect another character during game play, and the player can choose between her original and Dark Phoenix costumes. In addition to Jean, the PlayStation Portable version of this game also includes the Dark Phoenix separately as an unlockable bonus character.
 In Marvel: Ultimate Alliance, the Dark Phoenix makes an appearance in the ending of the game if the player chooses to save Nightcrawler instead of saving Jean in Mephisto's realm. Since Jean Grey does not die in the Infinity Vortex, she returns to Earth in the form of the Dark Phoenix to take vengeance upon those who did not save her.
 In Marvel: Ultimate Alliance 2, Jean Grey is a playable character. Her Phoenix costume is her primary outfit.
 Jean Grey appears as "Phoenix" as a playable character in the crossover fighting game Marvel vs. Capcom 3: Fate of Two Worlds and Ultimate Marvel vs. Capcom 3. She has the ability to resurrect herself as the Dark Phoenix.
 Jean Grey appears as "Phoenix" as a playable character in the Adobe Flash network game Marvel: Avengers Alliance.  During the game's third Special Operation (inspired by the Avengers vs. X-Men storyline), the Phoenix Force is hosted by Colossus, Cyclops, Emma Frost, Magik, and Jean Grey (as the Dark Phoenix). The game's Phoenix Five can either be the player's allies or enemies depending on which side the player chooses in the conflict.
 Phoenix is a playable character in Lego Marvel Super Heroes. Dark Phoenix is also available via downloadable content.
 In Marvel Heroes'', Jean Grey is an unlockable character with a power of the Phoenix.

References

External links
 Phoenix Force at Marvel.com
 

Characters created by Chris Claremont
Characters created by Dave Cockrum
Comics characters introduced in 1976
Female characters in comics
Fictional characters who can manipulate reality
Fictional characters who can manipulate time
Fictional characters with absorption or parasitic abilities
Fictional characters with death or rebirth abilities
Fictional characters with dimensional travel abilities
Fictional characters with elemental transmutation abilities
Fictional characters with fire or heat abilities
Fictional characters with immortality
Fictional characters with spirit possession or body swapping abilities
Fictional characters with superhuman senses
Marvel Comics characters who can teleport
Marvel Comics characters who have mental powers
Marvel Comics female supervillains
Marvel Comics telekinetics
Marvel Comics telepaths
Merged fictional characters
Phoenixes in popular culture
X-Men supporting characters

lt:Feniksas (komiksai)